Mehdi Ziadi (born 20 September 1986) is a former Moroccan tennis player.

Ziadi has a career high ATP singles ranking of 531 achieved on 5 November 2007. He also has a career high ATP doubles ranking of 408 achieved on 2 March 2009.

Ziadi made his ATP main draw debut at the 2004 Grand Prix Hassan II.

Ziadi represents Morocco at the Davis Cup, where he has a W/L record of 12–9.

References

External links

1986 births
Living people
Moroccan male tennis players
Sportspeople from Rabat
21st-century Moroccan people